The 18410 Puri–Howrah Sri Jagannath Express is an Express train belonging to Indian Railways – East Coast Railway zone that runs between  &  in India.

It operates as train number 18410 from Puri to Kolkata Shalimar and as train number 18409 in the reverse direction, serving the states of Odisha and West Bengal.

It is named after the Sri Jagannath temple located at Puri in the state of Odisha.

Service

From 14.01.2022, the terminating and originating station of 18410 and 18409 Sri Jagannath Express respectively, has been changed to Kolkata Shalimar instead of Howrah Junction.

Halts

Coach position

Traction
As the route is fully electrified, a -based WAP-4/WAP7 or a Tatanagar-based WAM-4 powers the train for its entire journey.

Rake sharing
Previously 18410 / 09 Puri–Howrah Sri Jagannath Express used to share its rake with the 12859 / 60 Gitanjali Express. Now it runs without any rake sharing arrangement.

Operation
18409 Kolkata Shalimar–Puri Express runs from Kolkata Shalimar on a daily basis, reaching Puri the next day.

18410 Puri–Kolkata Shalimar Express runs from Puri on a daily basis reaching Kolkata Shalimar the next day.

References

External links

Rail transport in Howrah
Transport in Puri
Named passenger trains of India
Rail transport in Odisha
Rail transport in West Bengal
Express trains in India